GJ 3991 (also known as Gliese 3991 and G 203-47) is a binary star system located 24.2 light-years away in the constellation Hercules. It consists of a Red dwarf star with 20-30% the mass of the Sun, and a White dwarf star roughly 50% the mass of the sun. The two components orbit each other in a tight orbit only 0.11 astronomical units from each other, with an orbital period of only 14.71 days. Due to their small separation, the two objects have never been visually resolved and are merely predicted from the radial velocity changes of GJ 3991 A, making the system a spectroscopic binary.

White dwarf
GJ 3991 B was first identified in 1997 by astronomers I. N. Reid and J. E. Gizis through significant radial velocity variations visible through GJ 3991 A, although were unable to identify the nature of the secondary object. In 1998, another group of astronomers was able to determine the secondary as a cold white dwarf star, the compact remnant that remains after a low-mass star such as the Sun is no longer able to fuse elements for energy. GJ 3991 B is the 9th nearest white dwarf, after Sirius B, Procyon B, Van Maanen 2, LP 145-141, 40 Eridani B, Stein 2051 B, G 240-72, and Gliese 223.2. Among these, GJ 3991 B is not only the coldest, but the only one in a short-period orbit with another star. GJ 3991 B is probably over 6 billion years old, making it the oldest among these objects as well.

See also
List of star systems within 20–25 light-years

References

Binary stars
M-type main-sequence stars
3991
083945
Hercules (constellation)
White dwarfs